Albani Josefina Lozada Jiménez (born July 5, 1965) competed as Miss Portuguesa in her country's national beauty pageant Miss Venezuela, obtaining the title of Miss World Venezuela.

She grew up in Acarigua and as the official representative of her country to the Miss World pageant held in London, United Kingdom on November 12, 1987, became 1st runner-up to eventual winner Ulla Weigerstorfer of Austria.

References

External links
Miss Venezuela Official Website
Miss World Official Website

1965 births
Living people
People from Caracas
Miss World 1987 delegates
Miss Venezuela World winners